Unley Oval (also known as Wigan Oval under a naming rights agreement), is a multi-use stadium in Unley, an inner southern suburb of Adelaide, South Australia.  It is used for lower-grade South Australian Grade Cricket League matches, but its main use is as the home ground for the Sturt Football Club in the South Australian National Football League (SANFL).

Overview
The stadium has a capacity of 15,000 people, with seating for up to 2,000. Its record crowd is 24,000 (estimated) attending a SANFL match between Sturt and Norwood on 9 June 1924 – at the time the highest for any suburban oval in Adelaide. The highest verified attendance was 22,015 for a league game against Port Adelaide during the 1968 season. This would stand as the record SANFL attendance at a suburban ground until 22,738 saw Port Adelaide play Norwood at Port's home ground Alberton Oval in 1977.

Unley Oval was the venue of one first-class match between South Australia and Lord Hawke's XI in 1903; until 2013, it was the only first class match that South Australia had ever hosted away from Adelaide Oval until selected Sheffield Shield games were played at Glenelg Oval from 2014. The match itself was remarkable: South Australia won by 97 runs after following on, and two different bowlers (George Thompson and Henry Hay) took nine-wicket innings hauls.

Dimensions
The dimensions of the playing surface for football are 160m × 115m. The oval is egg-shaped, such that the northern end is more narrow and has shallower pockets than the southern end. Unley Oval has two main grandstands located on the western side of the ground; the newer of the two stands, "The Jack Oatey Stand", is open to the public and seats 1,500, and the Members Stand which seats 500 people. As the ground is also a public park, the perimeter of the venue is currently unfenced, forcing the Sturt Football Club to erect temporary fencing on match days in order to charge admission, which is a large financial burden for the club.

Name
The stadium has previously been known as "Envestra Park", "House Brothers Oval" (from 2008 to 2010), and "Commander Centre Oval" (in 2011 and 2012), under various sponsorship deals. In 2015 Unley Oval was renamed Peter Motley Oval in honour of former Sturt champion and club #1 ticket holder Peter Motley.

References

External links

 

Cricket grounds in Australia
Sports venues in Adelaide
Australian rules football grounds
AFL Women's grounds